Lady Kul El-Arab is a 2008 Israeli documentary directed by Ibtisam Mara'ana which tells the story of Doaa "Angelina" Fares, a Druze model who entered the Miss Israel beauty contest in 2007. This caused some resentment from Israel's Druze community, and she dropped out of the contest following death threats against her for dishonouring her community and the subsequent arrest of five people, among them two of her uncles, for planning her murder.

Awards
 2009 ZagrebDox - International Competition Award
 2008 New Delhi International Women Film Festival - Best Director Award
 2008 IDFA Silver Wolf Competition - Special Jury Award

External links
 
 Contestant No. 2 (US Version broadcast on PBS)

Israeli documentary films
2008 films
Documentary films about violence against women
Israeli Druze
2008 documentary films
Violence against women in Israel
Druze culture